Mahasumpo Raveloson (January 1, 1909 in Belalanda, Madagascar – October 7, 1966) was a politician from Madagascar who served in the French National Assembly from 1951-1956 .

References 
 page on the French National Assembly website

1909 births
1966 deaths
People from Atsimo-Andrefana
Malagasy politicians
Deputies of the 2nd National Assembly of the French Fourth Republic